Nikola Šubić Zrinski Square (popularly referred to as Zrinjevac) is a square and park in Donji Grad, the central part of Zagreb, the capital of Croatia. It is located near the central Ban Jelačić Square, halfway towards the Main Railway Station. It is a part of the Green horseshoe or Lenuci's horseshoe ( or ), which consists of seven squares in Donji grad.

The southern part of Zrinjevac sports busts of significant Croatian people: Julije Klović, Andrija Medulić, Fran Krsto Frankopan, Nikola Jurišić, Ivan Kukuljević Sakcinski and Ivan Mažuranić.

In the middle of the park is a music pavilion built in 1891, gift of Eduard Prister, to the city of Zagreb.

Several institution are based in buildings around Zrinjevac:

 North side - The Supreme Court of the Republic of Croatia,
 West side - The Zagreb Archaeological Museum,
 South side - The Croatian Academy of Sciences and Arts, Strossmayer Gallery of Old Masters
 East side - The Ministry of Foreign Affairs and European Integration and the Zagreb County Court.

References

External links

Squares in Zagreb
Donji grad, Zagreb